The men's javelin throw at the 1971 European Athletics Championships was held in Helsinki, Finland, at Helsinki Olympic Stadium on 10 and 11 August 1971.

Medalists

Results

Final
11 August

Qualification
10 August

Participation
According to an unofficial count, 26 athletes from 12 countries participated in the event.

 (2)
 (3)
 (1)
 (3)
 (1)
 (2)
 (3)
 (3)
 (3)
 (1)
 (1)
 (3)

References

Javelin throw
Javelin throw at the European Athletics Championships